Softball competitions at the 2023 Pan American Games in Santiago, Chile are scheduled to be held from October 30 to November 4. The venue for the competition is the Baseball and Softball Center located at the Cerrillos commune.

A total of eight women's teams (each consisting up to 18 athletes) will compete in each tournament. This means a total of 144 athletes are scheduled to compete.

Qualification
A total of eight women's team qualified to compete at the games. The host nation (Chile) qualified automatically, along with the champions of the 2021 Junior Pan American Games and the top six teams at the 2022 Pan American Championships.

Participating nations
A total of 8 countries qualified softball teams.

Medalists

References

softball
softball
2023 in softball